Hernán Lara Zavala (born 28 February 1946) is a Mexican novelist, literary critic and academic at the National Autonomous University of Mexico.

He was educated at the National Autonomous University of Mexico and the University of East Anglia (MA, 1981). He was awarded the José Fuentes Mares National Prize for Literature in 1995. In 2010 he was awarded the Royal Academy of the Spanish Language prize.

Works

1981: De Zitilchén
1987: El Mismo Cielo
1989: Las Novela En El Quijote
1990: Charras
1992: Contra El Angel
1992: Tuch Y Odilón
1994: Después Del Amor Y Otros Cuentos
1995: Equipaje De Mano
1997: Cuentos Escogidos
1998: Viaje Al Corazón De La Península
2008: Península, Península
2010: El Guante Negro Y Otros Cuentos

References

1946 births
Living people
National Autonomous University of Mexico alumni
Alumni of the University of East Anglia
Academic staff of the National Autonomous University of Mexico
Mexican novelists
Male novelists
20th-century Mexican writers
20th-century Mexican male writers
21st-century Mexican writers
People from Mexico City
Mexican literary critics